Harry Holden may refer to:

Harry Holden (Home and Away), a fictional character from Home and Away
Sir Harry Cassie Holden, 2nd Baronet (1877–1965) of the Holden baronets

See also
Henry Holden (disambiguation)
Harold Holden, artist